Gloria Viseras (born 9 February 1965) is a Spanish gymnast. She competed in five events at the 1980 Summer Olympics.

References

1965 births
Living people
Spanish female artistic gymnasts
Olympic gymnasts of Spain
Gymnasts at the 1980 Summer Olympics
Sportspeople from Mexico City
20th-century Spanish women